Haggett is a surname. Notable people with the surname include:

Belinda Haggett (born 1962), former New South Wales Breakers and Australia cricketer
Calum Haggett (born 1990), English cricketer who plays for Kent County Cricket Club
Peter Haggett, CBE Sc.D. FBA (born 1933), British geographer, Professor Emeritus and Senior Research Fellow, University of Bristol
Reg Haggett, former association football player who represented New Zealand at international level

See also
Haggett Hall, set of two towers located in the northeast section of the University of Washington campus
Hogget (disambiguation)
Huggett